Thomas Erle may refer to two English people:

 Thomas Erle (1621-1650), lawyer and politician
 Thomas Erle (1650–1720), army general and politician

See also
Thomas Earle (disambiguation)